The Manifesto for Walloon Culture, was published in Liège on 15 September 1983 and signed by seventy-five "key figures in artistic, journalistic and university circles" of Wallonia.

Walloon language, regional varieties of French and Walloon culture 

The Flemish journalist, Guido Fonteyn, described it as a Walloon awakening.

For Dimitrios Karmis and Alain Gagnon, on the road to cultural self-assertion this manifesto has marked a powerful moment.

For Emmanuelle Labeau, Arthur Masson's novels before the period of the Manifesto (Masson died in 1970), are located in Wallonia,

The regional varieties of French are not necessarily the Walloon dialect but Philip Mosley wrote:

Criticism from Brussels 

This Manifesto was violently criticized in Brussels:

Further response

According to Michael Keating, John Loughlin, and Kris Deschouwer in 2003: The "single French culture" is still the official discourse, and is defended  by the French community authorities (...) The Walloon movement of today, supported by a small number of intellectual elites, defends very much the typical Walloon difference, but has not been able to mobilise for it. 

In December 2006, a Brussels manifesto was published partly in the same spirit as the Walloon manifesto, claiming a regionalisation (in favour of Brussels as well in favour of Wallonia), of the French Community. It was also signed by key figures of Brussels, such as the philosophers Philippe Van Parijs and Jean-Marc Ferry, so the Brussels manifesto has given the Walloon “regionalists" an opportunity to remind everyone that they have been calling for an end to the French-speaking Community and the transfer of its powers, especially its responsibilities for education and culture, to the Walloon Region since their 1983 "Manifesto for Walloon culture". 

Benoît Lechat summarized the issue: 

The conclusion of the Manifesto for Wallon culture states: All those who live and work in the Walloon region are undeniably part of Wallonia. All respectable human ideas and beliefs are also part of Wallonia (...) Being a straightforward community of human beings, Wallonia wishes to emerge as an appropriate entity which opens itself to the entire world.

New debates 

The Walloon Minister President started a debate about the Walloon identity on 1 March 2010 in the newspaper La Meuse. He made a proposal to his government to rename the 'Walloon Region' as 'Wallonia'. The director of the Institut Destrée commented on this initiative the day after on the RTBF. He linked this initiative and the Manifesto for Walloon culture together:

Le Figaro (4 March 2010) reminds the last sentences of the Manifesto for Walloon Culture : 'All those who live and work in the Walloon region are undeniably part of Wallonia.' These sentences are hopefully a reason to hope a peaceful debate...' 

Criticism about this new debate appears both in Wallonia and Brussels, but perhaps mainly in the Brussels' Newspapers. For instance Pascal Lorent in Le Soir 4 March 2010 writes: 'The Walloon identity doesn't exist'. And Pierre Bouillon wrote in Le Soir 6 March 2010 that the Walloon identity refers mainly to tourism, unemployment and bribery in Charleroi. It seems that the dispute between Brussels and Wallonia about this issue remains as for instance Europe since 1945: an encyclopedia, Tome I wrote it for some years: 'A Walloon identity is also emerging that exhibits at the political level the still mainly hidden tension between French-speaking Brussels and Wallonia'  On the contrary, it seems to Paul Piret, journalist at La Libre Belgique,  a debate on the concept 'Identity' is good about  political citizenship, roots, collective project and even pride.

Bouli Lanners said that his films are the reflection of the Walloon culture but with an Americain inspiration because we are overflowed by the American culture

See also
 Culture of Belgium

Notes

External links
 Manifesto for Walloon Culture (September 1983)
 Second Walloon Manifesto (September 2003)
 We Exist  Brussels Manifesto (December 2006)
 100 Wallons répondent au Nous existons bruxellois (French, Dutch, German, Walloon) (May 2007)
  An answer from people of Brussels Alain Maskens at the Assemblée wallonne 29 February 2008 (French)
 Twenty years Brussels autonomy bruXsel forum  That it is time to assume responsibility and that Brussels should not be joined with either Flanders or Wallonia but should become autonomous and that Belgium should be composed of 3 Regions (...) (January 2009)

Walloon movement
History of Wallonia
Walloon culture
1983 in Belgium

1983 documents